Sir William Knighton (1776–1836) was Private Secretary to the Sovereign, George IV.

William Knighton may also refer to:

William C. Knighton (1864–1938), American architect
Sir William Wellesley Knighton, 2nd Baronet (1811–1885) of the Knighton baronets
William Myles Knighton (born 1931), British civil servant